XHROOC-FM 101.7 is a radio station in Chetumal, Quintana Roo, known as La Guadalupana. It is owned by Grupo SIPSE.

History
XEROO-AM 960 received its concession in March 1964.

Upon migration to FM, which occurred in 2011, the callsign changed to add a C, in order to not conflict with sister station XHROO-FM 95.3.

References

Radio stations in Quintana Roo
Chetumal